is a district located in Tokushima Prefecture, Japan.

As of June 1, 2019, the district has an estimated population of 6,326 and a density of 35.3 persons per km2. The total area is 179.46 km2.

Towns and villages
Kamikatsu
Katsuura

Districts in Tokushima Prefecture